Star Wars Battlefront II is an action shooter video game based on the Star Wars franchise. It is the fourth main installment of the Star Wars: Battlefront series, and a sequel to the 2015 reboot of the series. It was developed by DICE, in collaboration with Criterion Games and Motive Studios, and published by Electronic Arts. The game was released worldwide on November 17, 2017, for the PlayStation 4, Windows, and Xbox One. The game features both single-player and multiplayer modes, and overall includes more content than its predecessor. The single-player campaign of the game is set between the films Return of the Jedi and The Force Awakens, and follows an original character, Iden Versio, the commander of an Imperial special ops strike force dubbed Inferno Squad, who defects to the New Republic after becoming disillusioned with the Galactic Empire's tactics. Most of the story takes place during the final year of the Galactic Civil War, before the Empire's definitive defeat at the Battle of Jakku.

Upon release, Battlefront II received mixed reviews from critics, with praise for the multiplayer, gameplay, balancing, visuals, and variety, but criticism for its single-player modes, campaign, microtransactions, and progression system. The game was also subject to widespread criticism regarding the status of its loot boxes, which could give players substantial gameplay advantages if purchased with real money. A response from EA's community team on Reddit on the topic became the single most down-voted comment in the site's history, amassing over 600,000 downvotes. In response, EA decided to remove microtransactions from the game.

Since its release, the game received numerous content additions through free title updates in an attempt to repair its reputation after launch, which brought in a large number of new players. These updates ended on April 29, 2020, after Electronic Arts concluded that the game had reached its desired number of players and had substantially improved since the initial release. A Celebration Edition of the game, which includes all in-game cosmetic options, was released on December 5, 2019.

Gameplay

Star Wars Battlefront II is a third- and first-person shooter, where players can partake in either ground battles, assuming the role of soldiers, or space battles, where players pilot starfighters. The game features both single-player and multiplayer game modes, and three distinct eras from the Star Wars saga: the Clone Wars, with battles taking place between the Galactic Republic and the Confederacy of Independent Systems; the Galactic Civil War, where battles between the Rebel Alliance and Galactic Empire take place; and the war between the Resistance and the First Order. Each faction has its own type of soldiers (e.g. clone troopers for the Republic, battle droids for the CIS, and stormtroopers for the Empire and the First Order) and starfighters. While the soldiers differ only in appearance and control identically, the starfighters feature unique abilities, offering a more varied gameplay style.

Battles take place across a variety of maps, and every era has its own exclusive maps. At launch, the game featured a total of 15 locations from the Star Wars universe, including Kamino, Kashyyyk, Naboo, Mos Eisley, Yavin IV, Hoth, Cloud City, Endor, the Death Star II, Jakku, Takodana, and Starkiller Base, as well as some space-exclusive locations, namely Ryloth, Fondor, and the Unknown Regions. Since then, eight more maps have been added: Crait, Jabba's Palace, Kessel, Geonosis, Felucia, Ajan Kloss, Scarif, and another space-only location, D'Qar. Some of the ground locations are also limited to certain game modes, of which there are several.

Classes 
The gameplay in Battlefront II is class-based. All factions have the same four soldier classes—Assault, Heavy, Officer, and Specialist—and three starfighter classes—Fighter, Interceptor, and Bomber (although the Resistance and the First Order do not feature the Bomber class). The ground battles feature additional Reinforcement classes, which are unlocked by trading in 'battle points', earned from defeating enemies and completing map-specific objectives. All factions have three soldier Reinforcements—the Enforcer, Aerial, and Infiltrator—and two vehicle Reinforcements—the Speeder and Armor. The Republic, CIS, Rebels, Empire, and First Order have an additional Reinforcement class—the Artillery—which is featured only in specific maps for the Galactic Assault mode (e.g. the MTT for the Separatists, which is available only on Naboo and Kashyyyk).

All classes can be leveled up with the exception of Artillery. After reaching a new level, the player is awarded a Skill Point that can be used to unlock or upgrade a Star Card. Star Cards are the main form of progression in Battlefront II, and can be equipped on a certain class to increase one of their stats, such as health regeneration or damage output, or to replace one of their abilities with a new one. Up to three Star Cards can be equipped at the same time for each class. Players can also customize their soldier classes by purchasing new appearances or unlocking new weapons via milestones. Although the game features limited weapon customization, each weapon is unique and offers a different playstyle. Furthermore, players can unlock weapon attachments, which alter a weapon's stats, such as its range or fire rate. The Reinforcement classes can also be leveled up and customized, but their weapons and abilities cannot be changed.

Heroes 
Aside from the basic soldier and Reinforcement classes, players can take on the role of several heroes or villains based on iconic Star Wars characters. Unlike in 2015's Battlefront, heroes are an actual class rather than a bonus and can be leveled up and receive new appearances. In multiplayer, heroes are only available in the Galactic Assault and Supremacy modes, and, similarly to Reinforcements, are unlocked by trading in 'battle points'. In the former mode, players can select any hero from the roster offered by the game, while in the latter, only era-specific heroes are available. Both sides can have a maximum of two heroes on the battlefield at the same time. There are also several hero-centered game modes, like Heroes vs. Villains and Hero Showdown, where heroes are the only class available to use, and, as such, do not cost any battle points.

At launch, the hero roster consisted of Luke Skywalker (Matthew Mercer), Leia Organa (Misty Lee), Han Solo (John Armstrong), Chewbacca, Lando Calrissian (Billy Dee Williams), Yoda (Tom Kane), and Rey (Daisy Ridley), while the villain roster included Darth Vader (Matt Sloan), Emperor Palpatine (Sam Witwer), Boba Fett (Temuera Morrison), Bossk (Dee Bradley Baker), Iden Versio (Janina Gavankar), Darth Maul (Sam Witwer), and Kylo Ren (Matthew Wood/Roger Craig Smith). Since then, Finn (John Boyega), Captain Phasma (Gwendoline Christie), Obi-Wan Kenobi (James Arnold Taylor), Anakin Skywalker (Matt Lanter), General Grievous (Matthew Wood), Count Dooku (Corey Burton), BB-8, and BB-9E have also been added. The game also features several hero and villain starfighters, namely Boba Fett's Slave I, Darth Maul's Scimitar, Darth Vader's TIE Advanced x1, Han Solo and Chewbacca's Millennium Falcon, Kylo Ren's TIE Silencer, Luke Skywalker's T-65B X-Wing, Poe Dameron's T-70 X-Wing, Rey and Chewbacca's Millennium Falcon, Yoda's Actis-class Light Interceptor, Iden Versio's TIE/in Fighter, Tallie Lintra's RZ-2 A-Wing, and Lando Calrissian and L3-37's Millennium Falcon.

Synopsis

Setting and characters 
Star Wars Battlefront II's single-player campaign has players explore various locations across the Star Wars galaxy, including familiar planets featured in the films, such as Endor, Naboo, Takodana, Bespin, and Jakku, as well as Fondor, Pillio, and Vardos, all three of which are new to the franchise. The events of the campaign begin around the time of Return of the Jedi's climax, and depict the final year of the Galactic Civil War, which ended with the Battle of Jakku that marked the Galactic Empire's defeat. The final level takes place 29 years after the conclusion of the Galactic Civil War, around the time of The Force Awakens. The Resurrection DLC expands upon the game's ending, featuring three additional levels that take place during The Force Awakens.

The campaign's protagonist and main playable character is Iden Versio (voiced by Janina Gavankar), the commander of Inferno Squad, a group of elite Imperial soldiers. Inferno Squad also includes Del Meeko (T. J. Ramini) and Gideon Hask (Paul Blackthorne), and is supervised by Iden's strict father, Admiral Garrick Versio (Anthony Skordi). In certain levels of the game, players take control of iconic Star Wars characters from the films instead of Iden, such as Luke Skywalker (Matthew Mercer), Leia Organa (Misty Lee), Han Solo (John Armstrong), Lando Calrissian (Billy Dee Williams), and Kylo Ren (Matthew Wood). Supporting characters include Rebel soldier and Inferno Squad member Shriv Suurgav (Dan Donohue), Imperial Protectorate Gleb, former smuggler and pirate-turned-tavern keeper Maz Kanata (Grey Griffin), Imperial defector Ralsius Paldora (Oliver Vaquer), and Iden and Del's daughter Zay (Brittany Volcy).

Plot
Iden Versio is captured by the Rebel Alliance and interrogated for the codes to unlock an Imperial transmission aboard a Mon Calamari Star Cruiser. She activates her droid, Dio, which sneaks to her cell and frees her; Iden had allowed herself to be captured in order to erase the Imperial transmission, which would reveal the Emperor's plan to ambush the Rebels at Endor. She successfully erases it, then escapes the ship by launching herself into space, whereupon she is intercepted by the Corvus, Inferno Squad's flagship. Aboard the Corvus, Iden confirms the mission's success to fellow squad members Del Meeko and Gideon Hask.

Later on Endor, Inferno Squad secures the perimeter around the shield generator protecting the Death Star II, which was destroyed by a Rebel squad, and watches with shock and horror as the Death Star II explodes moments later. Vice Admiral Sloane orders a full retreat, and Inferno Squad escapes the moon aboard TIE fighters before it is overrun by Rebel forces. After destroying a squadron of Rebel starfighters around the Death Star II's ruins, Inferno Squad arrives on Admiral Garrick Versio's Star Destroyer, the Eviscerator, where he informs Iden of the Emperor's death. A messenger droid then displays a hologram of the late Emperor issuing his last command: to initiate Operation: Cinder. Admiral Versio sends Iden and Hask to an Imperial shipyard over Fondor to protect Moff Raythe's Star Destroyer, the Dauntless, which hosts experimental satellites vital to the success of Operation: Cinder. The Dauntless comes under attack from a Rebel Star Cruiser, but Iden and Hask manage to board it and destroy its ion cannons, before freeing the Star Destroyer, allowing it to open fire on the Cruiser and destroy it.

Meanwhile, Del arrives on Pillio to destroy one of the Emperor's hidden bases. He encounters Luke Skywalker, who helps him fend off the local wildlife and gain access to the base, discovering it contains the Emperor's spoils of conquest, one of which Luke claims for himself. The pair part amicably, as Del begins to question the Empire's goals and motives. Later, Inferno Squad is sent to Iden's homeworld, the Imperial-controlled planet Vardos, to retrieve Protectorate Gleb, just as Operation: Cinder is about to begin. After witnessing the satellites for Operation: Cinder slowly destroying Vardos with storms, Iden and Del, disillusioned by the Empire's actions, abort their mission to try to evacuate civilians, causing Hask to betray them. The pair return to the Corvus and make their escape, now traitors to the Empire. Seeking out the Rebel Alliance, they meet General Lando Calrissian, who gives them the choice of helping stop Operation: Cinder, or escaping to start new lives. Choosing to help, they aid Leia Organa in protecting Naboo, destroying the satellites for Operation: Cinder, and reactivating the planet's defenses. After Naboo is liberated, Inferno Squad joins the New Republic.

Months later, Inferno Squad – Iden, Del, and Shriv Suurgav – is sent to Takodana to find General Han Solo, who has gone missing during his mission to extract critical data from an Imperial defector that can help liberate Kashyyyk. After Solo and the defector make their way past a squad of stormtroopers and back to the Millennium Falcon, Inferno Squad arrives to help them flee the planet. The recovered data reveals that Admiral Versio is commanding Imperial operations on both Bespin and Sullust. On Bespin, Iden and Del attempt to capture the Admiral, but are led into a trap by Hask. The pair escape, destroying a Star Destroyer fueling station in the process. On Sullust, Lando and Shriv investigate a hidden Imperial weapons cache and find a weapons factory instead, which they destroy.

With both operations crippled, the Imperial fleet makes a last stand at Jakku. During the battle, Iden shoots down Hask and boards the Eviscerator, intending to rescue her father. Admiral Versio decides to go down with his ship, feeling obligated to die with the Empire he fought to protect, and urges Iden to escape and live a new life, commending her for seeing the Empire's weaknesses. Iden takes an escape pod and reunites with Del and Shriv. Iden and Del embrace and kiss, as the battle marks the end of the Galactic Empire.

Three decades later, Del is captured on Pillio by Protectorate Gleb, who hands him over to Kylo Ren and the First Order. Ren uses the Force to interrogate Del about the location of the map leading to Luke Skywalker, before leaving him to Hask, who expresses disgust at Del choosing to father a daughter with Iden instead of becoming a soldier and kills him. Hask then tells Gleb that the New Republic cannot find out about "Project Resurrection" and orders her to leave the Corvus on Pillio as bait to lure Iden out of hiding.

Resurrection DLC
Shriv Suurgav, now an agent for the Resistance, discovers the abandoned Corvus and informs Iden and her daughter Zay, revealing that Del had been helping the Resistance investigate rumors of mass disappearances that may be connected to Project Resurrection. They head to Athulla, where Del was last seen, and are ambushed by a Jinata Security fleet, which they destroy. The survivors admit that they had been kidnapping children on the behalf of the First Order and that Project Resurrection had been moved to Vardos.

On Vardos, Iden and Shriv investigate, leaving Zay on the Corvus, and are captured by Hask, who reveals that he killed Gleb and Del and that the First Order has used Starkiller Base to destroy the Hosnian system, effectively wiping out the New Republic. He then orders his Star Destroyer, the Retribution, to destroy the Corvus, though Zay survives by taking an escape pod. Iden and Shriv escape after the Jinata Security, angry at the First Order for betraying them, attack Hask's men, and make their way to Zay. Deciding to help the Resistance, the trio use stolen TIE fighters to board the Retribution, whereupon they search the ship for information on Project Resurrection, eventually discovering that it involves the First Order kidnapping children and indoctrinating them to become stormtroopers. They also learn that First Order has built up a massive fleet large enough to retake the galaxy, and steal the plans of a First Order Dreadnought.

While Shriv goes to look for a ship to escape with, Iden and Zay destroy the Retribution'''s hyperspace generators, causing it to pull out of hyperspace near Starkiller Base, just as the Resistance destroys it. Hask ambushes them and shoots Iden before she throws him to his death. Iden then succumbs to her injury, not before ordering Zay to escape with the Dreadnought plans and without her. Zay reunites with Shriv and the pair escape the Retribution, before linking up with the Resistance. They transmit the plans to Leia Organa, who orders them to head to the Outer Rim to gather more allies.

Post-launch content
It was confirmed during EA Play 2017 that Star Wars: Battlefront II will not feature a Season Pass. Instead, all downloadable content was released via free title updates, split into multiple "seasons".

Since April 29, 2020, after EA concluded that the game had reached its desired number of players and had substantially improved since its initial release, the game no longer receives support for new content updates.

 The Last Jedi Season 
The first season, based on the 2017 film Star Wars: The Last Jedi, was released on December 5, 2017, ten days before the release of the film. It added content based on the film, including a space map over D'Qar, a new Galactic Assault map on the planet Crait, Finn and Captain Phasma as heroes for the Resistance and First Order, respectively, and Tallie Lintra's RZ-2 A-Wing as a new hero ship. The Last Jedi season also included a continuation of the single-player campaign, titled Battlefront II: Resurrection, which was made available on December 13.

 Solo: A Star Wars Story Season 
On May 3, 2018, EA Star Wars announced on Twitter stating that the second season of content would be based on the film Solo: A Star Wars Story. The first part of the season was released on May 16 and added a new game mode called Hero Showdown, starfighters to the Arcade, and a returning map from 2015's Star Wars Battlefront, Jabba's Palace, along with skins for Leia Organa and Lando Calrissian based on their disguises in Return of the Jedi. The second part was released on June 12 and added a new map set in the mines of the planet Kessel and a new variation of the Millennium Falcon (based on its appearance in Solo) as a hero ship, along with reintroducing the game mode Extraction, initially available only on the two new maps added with this season. New skins were also released for Han Solo, Lando Calrissian, and Chewbacca, based on their appearances in Solo.

 Clone Wars Season 
In February 2018, the game's design director, Dennis Brännvall, teased that content based on the Clone Wars era, primarily the animated series Star Wars: The Clone Wars, will be released at some point in the future. At EA Play 2018 it was revealed that said content will be released in the fall of the same year, and will include a new Galactic Assault map set on Geonosis, new clone trooper skins, and Anakin Skywalker, Obi-Wan Kenobi, General Grievous and Count Dooku as new playable heroes, with the actors who voiced them in The Clone Wars recording new voice lines for them. On October 30, Grievous was added as a new villain for the Separatists, along with an alternative skin. On November 28, the Geonosis map and Obi-Wan Kenobi were added to the game, along with new reinforcement classes, 212th Attack Battalion clone skins, and new skins for Grievous and Obi-Wan.

An update released on January 23, 2019, added Count Dooku to the game and made the Geonosis map available for other game modes. On February 27, Anakin Skywalker was added, along with new skins for him, Dooku, and clone troopers, voice lines for all heroes, and a rework of emotes. On March 26, the widely anticipated Capital Supremacy mode was released, along with the Infiltrator class and a major gameplay overhaul. On April 24, a new Kashyyyk map for Capital Supremacy was added, alongside some challenges and a new skin for Leia Organa, in celebration for Star Wars Day. On May 22, a new Kamino map for Capital Supremacy was added. On June 21, a new Naboo map for Capital Supremacy was added, alongside new skins for Anakin Skywalker and clone troopers, the Droideka as a new variation of the Enforcer class for the Separatists, and the TX-130 assault tank as a new variation of the Armor class for the Republic.

An update released on August 28, 2019, added new skins for battle droids, the maps from Capital Supremacy to the Heroes vs. Villains mode, and new Star Cards to replace the Health on Kill ones, with Health on Kill now becoming a passive ability for all heroes. On September 25, a new Felucia map for Capital Supremacy was added, along with Clone Commandos as a new variation of the Enforcer class for the Republic, a new skin for Luke Skywalker, and two game modes: an offline mode called Instant Action, and a PvE game mode called Co-Op, both of which included all Capital Supremacy maps released thus far. Furthermore, the Daily Crates and the Extraction mode were removed (the latter being merged with Strike). On October 23, the Ewok Hunt and Co-Op modes received major overhauls, and a Felucia map for Heroes vs. Villains was added, alongside new skins for the Jet Trooper, Luke Skywalker, and Han Solo.

 The Rise of Skywalker Season & Celebration Edition 
On December 5, 2019, a Celebration Edition of the game was released, including all cosmetic options released thus far; it can be bought both separately or as an upgrade to the original version. Along with the Celebration Edition came an update, originally meant for late November, which added new skins for the Infiltrator and Enforcer classes and a gameplay overhaul. On December 17, an update was released that added content based on the film Star Wars: The Rise of Skywalker, including a new Ajan Kloss map, Co-Op to the sequel trilogy era, new skins for Rey, Finn and Kylo Ren, and new Reinforcement classes for the sequel trilogy era (the Ovissian Gunner as the Enforcer and the Caphex Spy as the Infiltrator for the Resistance, and the Sith Trooper as the Infiltrator and the Jet Trooper as the Aerial for the First Order). On February 3, 2020, an update originally meant for late January added BB-8 and BB-9E as new heroes for the Resistance and First Order, respectively, Capital Supremacy and Instant Action to the sequel trilogy era, and several gameplay changes.

 Original Trilogy updates 
On February 26, 2020, a major update added content based on the original Star Wars trilogy, including the Co-Op mode, four new weapons (three of them returning from 2015's Star Wars: Battlefront), and the Infiltrator class, along with new skins for this era's pre-existing Reinforcement classes. It also added a new Geonosis map to Heroes vs. Villains, and the maps from the prequel era Capital Supremacy to Co-Op, along with several changes to the gameplay. The next update, initially meant for late March, was delayed twice: once for "mid-April", and the second time for late April. The update was released on April 29, and added content based on the film Rogue One, including a Scarif map and new skins for both Rebel soldiers and Imperial stormtroopers. It also added a new offline game mode called Instant Action Missions (which was merged with the original Instant Action), Capital Supremacy to the original trilogy era, and new skins for Rey, Kylo Ren, Emperor Palpatine, and Darth Maul, and made Palpatine and Chewbacca available as heroes for the sequel trilogy era, and Yoda and Darth Maul for the original trilogy era.

 Development and marketing 
On May 10, 2016, the development of Star Wars Battlefront II was announced, led by DICE, with Motive Studios being responsible for the single player campaign and Criterion Games responsible for the starfighters gameplay and mechanics. The sequel to 2015's rebooted Star Wars Battlefront features content from the sequel trilogy of films. Creative director Bernd Diemer has stated that the company has replaced the Season Pass system of paid expansion of content, because that system was determined to have "fragmented" the player community of the 2015 predecessor game. The new expansion system is designed to allow all players "to play longer". Executive producer Matthew Webster announced on April 15, 2017, at Star Wars Celebration that the worldwide release of the game would be November 17, 2017. The Battlefront II beta test period started on October 4, 2017, for players who pre-ordered the game. It was expanded to an open beta on October 6, and ran until October 11. A 10-hour trial version was made available to EA Access and Origin Access subscribers on November 9, 2017.

A tie-in novel, Star Wars Battlefront II: Inferno Squad, was released on July 25, 2017. Written by Christie Golden, it serves as a direct prelude to the game and follows the exploits of the Galactic Empire's titular squad as it seeks to eliminate what was left of Saw Gerrera's rebel cell after the events of the 2016 film Rogue One. On November 10, 2017, Electronic Arts announced the first in a series of free downloadable content for the game, featuring the planets D'Qar and Crait and the playable hero characters Finn and Captain Phasma. This content is a direct tie-in to December's Star Wars: The Last Jedi.

ReceptionStar Wars Battlefront II received "mixed or average" reviews, according to review aggregator Metacritic. Metacritic user reviews for the PlayStation 4 version reached a low rating of 0.8/10, labeled as "overwhelming dislike", due to the controversies (see below) and review bombing.

In his 4/5 star review for GamesRadar+, Andy Hartup praised the multiplayer but criticized the single-player modes, saying the game has a "very strong multiplayer offering tarnished by overly complicated character progression, and a lavish, beautiful story campaign lacking in substance or subtlety." Game Revolution felt the campaign started strong but weakened as it progressed, praising the multiplayer gameplay while criticizing the microtransactions, loot box progression system, and locking of heroes.

For EGMs review, Nick Plessas praised the multiplayer combat, balancing, and variety, but criticized the game's sustained focus on loot crates. Andrew Reiner of Game Informer gave the game 6.5/10, writing "Answering the call for more content, Star Wars Battlefront II offers a full campaign and more than enough multiplayer material, but the entire experience is brought down by microtransactions." IGN's Tom Marks also gave the game 6.5/10, saying "Star Wars Battlefront 2 has great feeling blasters, but its progression system makes firing them an unsatisfying grind."

The game was nominated for "Best Shooter", "Best Graphics" and "Best Multiplayer" in IGN's Best of 2017 Awards, and was a runner-up for "Most Disappointing Game" in Giant Bomb's 2017 Game of the Year Awards. In Game Informers Reader's Choice Best of 2017 Awards, fewer readers voted for the game for "Best Co-Op Multiplayer". The website also awarded the game for "Best Graphics", "Best Audio" and "Biggest Disappointment" in their 2017 Shooter of the Year Awards. Ben "Yahtzee" Croshaw of Zero Punctuation ranked the game at No. 1 on his list of the Five Blandest Games of 2017.

In 2019, two years after the game's release, IGN published a new review of the game, after 2 years worth of updates. In the new review, David Jagneaux gave the game 8.8/10 (compared to the original review's 6.5/10), saying "After over two years of updates and changes, EA and DICE have redeemed this gorgeous shooter and turned it into one of the best multiplayer adaptations of the Star Wars universe to date." Jagneaux noted that the significant improvements were to the multiplayer portion of the game and that the single-player story remained "overly safe, short, and disappointing".

 Sales 
In the U.S., Star Wars Battlefront II was the second best-selling title in November, behind Call of Duty: WWII. Within its first week on sale in Japan, the PlayStation 4 version sold 38,769 copies, placing it at number four on the all format sales chart. By December 2017, the game had sold 9 million copies worldwide. In January 2018, EA announced that the game missed their sales target as they had hoped to sell 10 million copies in that time, and blamed the loot crate controversy.

Accolades

Microtransactions controversy
During pre-release beta trials, the game's publisher EA was criticized by gamers and the gaming press for introducing a loot box monetization scheme that gave players substantial gameplay advantages through items purchased in-game with real money. Responding to the controversy, developers had adjusted the number of in-game items a player receives through playing the game. However, after the game went into pre-release a number of players and journalists who received the pre-release copy of the game reported various controversial gameplay features, such as rewards being unrelated to the player's performance in the game. The poorly-weighed reward system combined with a weak inactivity detection allowed many players to use rubber bands to tightly tie their game controllers for automatically farming points during multiplayer battles, ruining the experience of other active online players.

On November 12, 2017, a Reddit user complained that although they spent  to purchase the Deluxe Edition of the game, Darth Vader remained inaccessible for play and the use of this character required a large amount of in-game credits. Players estimated that it would take 40 hours of "grinding" to accumulate enough credits to unlock a single hero. In response to the community's backlash, EA's Community Team defended the controversial changes by saying their intent to make users earn credits to unlock heroes was to give users "a sense of pride and accomplishment" after unlocking a hero. This led to many Reddit users becoming frustrated at the response, which generated 667,821 down-votes, making it the most down-voted comment in the site's history. In 2019, the comment was inducted into the Guinness World Records. In response to the community's outrage, EA lowered the cost of credits to unlock heroes by 75%. However, the credits awarded for completing the campaign were also reduced.

On the day before release, EA disabled microtransactions entirely, citing players' concerns that they gave buyers unfair advantages. They stated their intent to reintroduce them at a later date after unspecified changes had been made. The uproar from social media and poor press reception on its microtransactions had a negative impact on EA's share price which dropped by 2.5% on the launch day of the game. Analysts in Wall Street also lowered their expectations of the game's financial prospects. A Wall Street analyst writing for CNBC noted how video games are still the cheapest entertainment medium per hour of use, and even with the added microtransactions, playing Battlefront II was still notably cheaper than paying to see the theatrical release of a film. By the end of November 2017, EA had lost $3 billion in stock value since the launch of the game. On March 16, 2018, developer DICE announced an overhaul for the progression and economic system. Loot crates will only contain credits, one of the in-game currencies, and cosmetic items while crystals, the other in-game currency, can be bought solely for the purpose of purchasing cosmetic items for characters in the game. Progression for player abilities, or "Star Cards", is now linear as players must play a certain class or hero in order to unlock a "Skill Point" for that trooper or hero, which can then be used to purchase a new card or upgrade one the player already owns. The first part of this update was released on March 21, which included permanently unlocking all heroes and vehicles for players regardless of progression, while the second part was released in April.

 Government responses 

On November 15, two days before its release, the Belgian gambling regulator announced that it was investigating the game, alongside Overwatch, to determine whether loot boxes constituted unlicensed gambling. In response to the investigation, EA claimed that Battlefront IIs loot boxes do not constitute gambling. The Belgian Gaming Commission ultimately declared loot boxes to be illegal under gambling laws but found that Battlefront II was not in violation as EA had temporarily removed micro-transactions from the game. After the investigation reported its conclusion, the Minister of Justice of Belgium Koen Geens expressed that if they prove loot boxes violate gambling laws he would start working on banning loot boxes in any future video games sold in the entire European Union.

Reacting to the conclusion of the Belgian gambling regulator's investigation, the head of the Dutch Gambling commission announced the start of their own investigation of Battlefront II and the issue in general, and asked parents "to keep an eye at the games their children play". Chris Lee, a member of the Hawaii House of Representatives, called Star Wars: Battlefront II "an online casino designed to trap little kids" and announced his intention to ban such practices in the state of Hawaii. Another representative compared playing Battlefront II to smoking cigarettes, saying: "We didn't allow Joe Camel to encourage your kids to smoke cigarettes, and we shouldn't allow Star Wars to encourage your kids to gamble." Singapore's National Council on Problem Gambling are monitoring the situation following the uproar on the game, as loot boxes do not fall under the Remote Gambling Act. Authorities in Australia are also investigating the situation. The Parliament of the United Kingdom investigated the concerns around loot boxes and whether they constitute gambling, and were later told by EA that lootboxes are "quite ethical and fun" and that they are the equivalent of Kinder Eggs. The UK Parliament later said that loot boxes do constitute gambling and should be regulated as such.

Notes

See alsoInferno Squad'', the single-player campaign tie-in novel
Iden Versio, the main character of the game's single-player campaign

References

External links

 
 
 Star Wars Battlefront II on starwars.com

2017 video games
Asymmetrical multiplayer video games
Digital Illusions CE games
Electronic Arts games
First-person shooters
Frostbite (game engine) games
Multiplayer and single-player video games
PlayStation 4 games
PlayStation 4 Pro enhanced games
Science fiction video games
Space opera video games
Split-screen multiplayer games
Star Wars: Battlefront
Third-person shooters
Video game controversies
Video games containing loot boxes
Video games developed in Canada
Video games developed in Sweden
Video games developed in the United Kingdom
Video games scored by Lennie Moore
Video game sequels
Video games featuring female protagonists
Windows games
Xbox One games
Xbox One X enhanced games
Motive Studio games